Kumatoeides is a genus of leaf beetles in the subfamily Eumolpinae. The genus is endemic to New Caledonia. The genus was first erected in 2018 by Spanish entomologist Jesús Gómez-Zurita. The generic name is the Latin transliteration of the Greek adjective , meaning "corrugated", referring to the regular striae on the elytra of the beetles.

Species
 Kumatoeides anomala Gómez-Zurita, 2018
 Kumatoeides aulacia Gómez-Zurita, 2018
 Kumatoeides costata (Jolivet, Verma & Mille, 2007)
 Kumatoeides leptalei Gómez-Zurita, 2018
 Kumatoeides megale Gómez-Zurita, 2018
 Kumatoeides metallica Gómez-Zurita, 2018
 Kumatoeides millei Gómez-Zurita, 2018
 Kumatoeides tarsalis Gómez-Zurita, 2018
 Kumatoeides wanati Gómez-Zurita, 2018

References

Eumolpinae
Chrysomelidae genera
Beetles of Oceania
Insects of New Caledonia
Endemic fauna of New Caledonia